Emilia-Romagna (both also ; ;  or Emîlia-Rumâgna) is one of the 20 administrative regions of Italy, situated in the north of the country, comprising the historical regions of Emilia and Romagna. Its capital is Bologna.

Emilia-Romagna is one of the wealthiest and most developed regions in Europe, with the third highest gross domestic product per capita in Italy. Bologna, its capital, has one of Italy's highest quality of life indices and advanced social services. Emilia-Romagna is also a cultural, economic, and tourist center, being the home of the University of Bologna, the oldest university in the world; containing Romanesque and Renaissance cities, such as Modena, Parma and Ferrara, and the once Western Roman Empire's capital city, Ravenna; encompassing eleven UNESCO heritage sites; being a center for food and automobile production (home of automotive companies such as Ferrari, Lamborghini, Maserati, Pagani, De Tomaso, Dallara, and Ducati); and having popular coastal resorts such as Cervia, Cesenatico, Rimini and Riccione.
In 2018, the Lonely Planet guide named Emilia-Romagna as the best place to see in Europe. The region is also home to the third largest community of foreign residents in the country, after Lombardy and Lazio.

Etymology 
The name Emilia-Romagna is a legacy of Ancient Rome. Emilia derives from the via Aemilia, the Roman road connecting Piacenza to Rimini, completed in 187 BC and named after the consul Marcus Aemilius Lepidus. Romagna derives from Romània, the name of the Eastern Roman Empire applied to Ravenna by the Lombards when the western Empire had ceased to exist and Ravenna was an outpost of the east (540–751).

History

Prehistory and antiquity
Before the Romans took control of present-day Emilia-Romagna, it had been part of the Etruscan world and subsequently that of the Gauls. During the first thousand years of Christianity, trade flourished, as did culture and religion, thanks to the region's numerous monasteries.

Early origins
The history of Emilia-Romagna dates back to Roman times when the region of Emilia was ruled by imperial judges linked to the nearby regions of either Liguria or Tuscany. After the fall of the Roman Empire in the 6th century, the Lombards, a Germanic tribe, founded the kingdom of Lombardy in northern and central Italy. This kingdom, which included the region known as Emilia, flourished until the Lombard dynasty was overthrown by the Frankish king Charlemagne in 774. From the 6th to 8th centuries, the region of Romagna was under Byzantine rule and Ravenna was the capital of the Exarchate of Italy within the Eastern Roman Empire. In the 8th century, this region became a province of the Papal States when Pepin, the son of Charlemagne, donated the land to the Pope in 754.

Middle Ages to early modern period
During the 10th century, northern Italy became part of the Holy Roman Empire under the control of the Germanic leader Otto I. The Holy Roman emperors had varying degrees of control over northern Italy until the close of the Middle Ages. In the 12th century, the papacy extended its political influence and city states began to form in opposition to the Holy Roman emperors.

The northern cities, supported by the Pope, formed the Lombard League and reduced the influence of the ruling Hohenstaufen dynasty over their lands. Division between imperial partisans and their opponents created factions called the Guelphs and the Ghibelines which would divide the cities for centuries. For the next few centuries both Emilia and Romagna were ruled by papal legates or representatives of the Pope.

The University of Bologna—the oldest university in the world,  established in AD 1088—and its bustling towns kept trade and intellectual life alive. Local nobility like the Este of Ferrara, the Malatesta of Rimini, the Popes of Rome, the Farnese of Parma and Piacenza, and the Duchy of Modena and Reggio, jostled for power and influence.

The House of Este gained a notable profile for its political and military might and its patronage of the arts: it left behind a vast heritage of splendid Renaissance palaces, precious paintings and literary masterpieces, such as the works of Ludovico Ariosto, Torquato Tasso and Matteo Maria Boiardo.

Following the rise of Napoleon, the region of Emilia came under French control.
After the Congress of Vienna in 1815, there was a growing movement for Italian national unity and independence. In 1848, a revolution in Vienna initiated uprisings against Austrian rule. The following decades saw uprisings in several regions and, in 1861, the Kingdom of Italy was established. During this Italian Unification, the territories of Emilia and Romagna would be incorporated into the new nation.

Late modern and contemporary
In the 16th century, most of what would become Emilia-Romagna had been seized by the Papal States, but the territories of Parma, Piacenza, and Modena remained independent until Emilia-Romagna became part of the Italian kingdom between 1859 and 1861.

After the First world war, Emilia-Romagna was at the centre of the so-called Biennio Rosso, a period of left-wing agitations that paved the way for Benito Mussolini's coup d'état in 1922 and the birth of the Fascist regime in Italy. Mussolini, a native of Emilia-Romagna, sponsored the rise of many hierarchs coming from his same region, such as Italo Balbo, Dino Grandi and Edmondo Rossoni.

Towards the end of the Second World War, Emilia-Romagna was occupied by Germany and has been the theatre of numerous Nazi war crimes, such as the Marzabotto massacre in which 770 innocent civilians were brutally executed by German troops.

During the Cold war era, Bologna, traditionally a left-wing city, was particularly hit by political street violence and terrorism; in 1980 a far-right terrorist group detonated a bomb at the city's main railway station, killing 85 people and wounding more than 200.

After the referendum of 2006, seven municipalities of Montefeltro were detached from the Province of Pesaro and Urbino (Marche) to join that of Rimini on 15 August 2009. The municipalities are Casteldelci, Maiolo, Novafeltria, Pennabilli, San Leo, Sant'Agata Feltria and Talamello.

On 20 and 29 May 2012 two powerful earthquakes struck the central area of the region, killing 27 people and causing substantial damages to the region's artistic heritage as well as to numerous manufacturing facilities. The 5.8 magnitude earthquake left 14,000 people temporarily homeless.

Geography 

The region of Emilia-Romagna consists of nine provinces and covers an area of 22,446 km2 (8,666 sq. mi.), ranking sixth in Italy. Nearly half of the region (48%) consists of plains while 27% is hilly and 25% mountainous. The region's section of the Apennines is marked by areas of flysch, badland erosion (calanques) and caves.

The plain was formed by the gradual retreat of the sea from the Po basin and by the detritus deposited by the rivers. Almost entirely marshland in ancient times, its history is characterised by the hard work of its people to reclaim and reshape the land in order to achieve a better standard of living.

The geology varies, with lagoons and saline areas in the north and many thermal springs throughout the rest of the region as a result of groundwater rising towards the surface at different periods of history. All the rivers rise locally in the Apennines except for the Po, which has its source in the Alps in Piedmont.

The region has temperate broadleaved and mixed forests and the vegetation may be divided into belts: the Common oak-European hornbeam belt (Padan plain and adriatic coast) which is now covered (apart from the Mesóla forest in Province of Ferrara) with fruit orchards and fields of wheat and sugar beet, the Pubescent oak-European hop-hornbeam belt on the lower slopes up to 800-900 m, the European beech-Silver fir belt between 800-900 and 1,700 m and the final mountain heath belt above 1,700-1,800 m. Emilia-Romagna has two Italian National Parks, the Foreste Casentinesi National Park and the Appennino Tosco-Emiliano National Park.

Land use 
Emilia-Romagna has been a highly populated area since ancient times. Inhabitants over the centuries have radically altered the landscape, building cities, reclaiming wetlands, and establishing large agricultural areas. All these transformations in past centuries changed the aspect of the region, converting large natural areas to cultivation, up until the 1960s. The trend then changed, and agricultural lands began giving way to residential and industrial areas. The increase of urban-industrial areas continued at very high rates until the end of the 2010s. In the same period, hilly and mountainous areas saw an increase in the registration of semi-natural areas, because of the abandonment of agricultural lands.

Land use changes can have strong effects on ecological functions. Human interactions such as agriculture, forestation and deforestation affect soil function, e.g. food and other biomass production, storing, filtering and transformation, habitat and gene pool.

In the Emilia-Romagna plain, which represents half of the region and where three quarters of the population of the region live, the agricultural land area has been reduced by 157 km2 while urban and industrial areas have increased to over 130 km2 between 2003 and 2008. The impact of land use and particularly of the urbanisation of the Emilia-Romagna plain during this period has had some strong consequences in the economical and ecological assessment of the region. The loss of arable land is equivalent to a permanent loss of the capacity to feed 440,000 persons per year from resources grown within the region.  The increased water runoff due to soil sealing requires adaptation measures for river and irrigation canals such as the building of retention basins, at a total cost estimated in the order of billions of euros.

In 2000 there were 103,700 farm holdings and in 2010 there were 73,470, or a -29.2% loss in holdings for the region. During this same timeframe there was a 14.5% decrease in the farm labor workforce.

Government and politics 

 
The Regional Government (Giunta Regionale) is presided by the President of the Region (Presidente della Regione), who is elected for a five-year term. The Regional Government is composed of the President and the Ministers (Assessori), of which there are currently twelve including the Vice President and the Under-Secretary for the President's office.

Apart from the province of Piacenza, Emilia-Romagna was historically a stronghold of the Italian Communist Party, forming the Italian "Red Quadrilateral" or sometimes "Red Belt" called with Tuscany, Umbria and Marche. This is probably due to the strength of the anti-fascist resistance around the time of World War II as well as a strong tradition of anti-clericalism dating from the 19th century, when part of the region belonged to the Papal States. The strength of the anti-fascist resistance is one of the main factors, along with the effectiveness of trade-unionism, that led to the dominance of the PCI in the region.

Emilia-Romagna has since World War II been a left-wing stronghold, nowadays led by the Democratic Party, since its creation in 2007.

Administrative divisions 

Emilia-Romagna is divided into nine provinces. Apart from the creation of the Metropolitan City of Bologna, plans to reduce the number of provinces from nine to four have been dropped.

Demographics 

ISTAT estimates the population of Emilia-Romagna was 4,459,577 on 1 January 2019. The population density, which was equal to 200 inhabitants per km2 in 2019, is close to the national average. The population of this region is traditionally evenly distributed, with no dominant metropolis but rather a line of medium-sized cities along the Via Emilia, where two thirds of the population and the majority of the industrial production are concentrated. The coast of Romagna is also densely populated due to the booming seaside tourism in recent decades. In the peripheral areas of the Apennine Mountains and the agricultural plains around Ferrara and Piacenza, the population is less dense.

Cities, towns and metropolitan areas

The region has nine cities with populations exceeding one hundred thousand: Bologna, Parma, Modena, Reggio Emilia, Ravenna, Rimini, Ferrara, Forlì and Piacenza. These cities rank among the 50 most populous in Italy. The regional capital, Bologna, has about 400,000 inhabitants and lies at the heart of a metropolitan area of about one million residents.

Immigration and ethnicity

Between 1876 and 1976, about 1.2 million people emigrated from Emilia-Romagna to other countries. , there were 119,369 people from this region living outside Italy, particularly in Argentina, Switzerland, France, the United Kingdom and Brazil. , the Italian National Institute of Statistics (ISTAT) estimated that 365,687 foreign-born immigrants lived in Emilia-Romagna, equal to 8.5% of the total regional population.

Language

Apart from standard Italian, Emilian and Romagnolo, two closely related languages that are part of the Emiliano-Romagnolo language family, are the local languages of Emilia-Romagna. They are Romance languages spoken in the region, in Northern Marche and other nearby areas such as parts of Massa-Carrara, Mantua, Pavia and Rovigo provinces and in San Marino. The Sillaro river ( in Emilian), near the town of Castel San Pietro Terme, is the border between Emilia and Romagna. They belong to the Northern Italian group within Romance languages (like Piedmontese, Lombard, Ligurian and Venetian), which is included in the wider group of western Romance languages (including French, Occitan and Catalan). They are considered minority languages, structurally separated from Italian by the Ethnologue and by the Red Book of Endangered Languages of UNESCO.

Economy 

Emilia-Romagna today is considered one of the richest European regions and the third wealthiest Italian region by gross domestic product (GDP) per capita. These results have been achieved by developing a very well balanced economy that comprises Italy's biggest agricultural sector as well as a long-standing tradition in automobile, motor and mechanics manufacturing and a strong banking and insurance industry.

Agriculture
In spite of the depth and variety of industrial activities in the region, agriculture has not been eclipsed. Emilia-Romagna is among the leading regions in the country, with farming contributing 5.8% of the gross regional product. The agricultural sector has aimed for increased competitiveness by means of structural reorganisation and high-quality products, and this has led to the success of marketed brands. Cereals, potatoes, maize, tomatoes and onions are the most important products, along with fruit and grapes for the production of wine (of which the best known are Emilia's Lambrusco, Bologna's , Romagna's Sangiovese and white Albana). Alongside cereals, which for centuries remained the first local product, the cultivation of fruit trees has developed (especially peaches, but also apricots, plums, apples and pears).

Cattle and pig breeding are also highly developed. Farm cooperatives have been working along these lines in recent years. With their long tradition in the region there are now about 8,100 cooperatives, generally in the agricultural sector and mainly located in the provinces of Bologna (2,160) and Forlì-Cesena (1,300).

Industry
The regional economy is more geared to export markets than other regions in the country: the main exports are from mechanical engineering (53%), the extraction of non-metallic minerals (13%) and the clothing industry (10%). Industry in the region presents a varied and complex picture and is located along the Via Emilia.

The food industry (e.g. Barilla, Parmalat, Granarolo, Zanetti, Grandi Salumifici Italiani, Cremonini, Fini, Conserve Italia) is particularly concentrated in Parma, Modena and Bologna. Very important is production of Parma ham, Parmesan and Grana Padano cheeses, Modena balsamic vinegar, Mortadella sausages. It is not restricted to these famous products, but also include production of sausages, other cheese, dairy products, coffee, sugar, fruit and vegetable conserves and stuffed pasta.

Automotive industry produce a sport cars (Ferrari, Lamborghini, Maserati, Pagani), trucks (Astra), buses (Menarinibus) and motorcycles (Ducati, Bimota).

Machine building is well-developed and represented with fork-lifts (OM Still, FMTH Fantuzzi), skid-steer loader (CNH Industrial),  tractors (Argo, Goldoni, Arbos), motors (VM Motori, Lombardini), vehicle gas-fuel equipment (Landi Renzo), undercarriages (ThyssenKrupp Berco), ceramic machine (SACMI), packaging machine (SACMI, IMA), pumps (Interpump), wood-working machine tools (SCM Group), home appliance (Smeg, Saeco), automatic data capture equipment (Datalogic) etc.

Other industrial park is Mirandola Biomedical District. In Parma there is pharmaceutical manufacturing from Chiesi Farmaceutici.

Sport and fitness articles is manufacturing by Technogym in Cesena.

The ceramic sector is concentrated in Faenza and Sassuolo.

Footwear industry is well developed and located in 2 industrial districts San Mauro Pascoli and between Fusignano and Bagnacavallo.

Tourism
Tourism is increasingly important, especially along the Adriatic coastline and the cities of art. The most popular location for seaside tourism is Rimini.

Transport
The region of Emilia-Romagna has a very good system of transport, with 574 km of motorways, 1,053 km of railways and airports in Bologna, Forlì, Parma and Rimini. The main motorway crosses the region from north-west (Piacenza) to the south-east (Adriatic coast), connecting the main cities of Parma, Reggio Emilia, Modena, Bologna, and from here further to Ravenna, Rimini and the Adriatic coast.

Unemployment rate 
The unemployment rate stood at 5.7% in 2020 and was lower than the national average of 9.2%.

Culture

Cinema

Emilia-Romagna has given birth to a number of important filmmakers and actors and was the main setting for numerous important movies. Bernardo Bertolucci was a native from Parma and his 1976 masterpiece, 1900, was partially set in Emilia-Romagna. Federico Fellini, a native of Rimini, shot many movies in the region, among them Amarcord. Pier Paolo Pasolini, a native from Bologna, in addition to being a film director, was a poet, writer, and intellectual, who also distinguished himself as an actor, journalist, novelist, playwright, and political figure. Michelangelo Antonioni, a native of Ferrara, shot his 1964 movie Red Desert in Ravenna. Florestano Vancini, also from Ferrara, shot there his 1960 film Long Night in 1943. Pupi Avati, a native of Bologna, shot numerous movies in the region, including the 1976 horror-trhiller The House with Laughing Windows. Marco Bellocchio, a native of Bobbio, near Piacenza, directed many award-winning movies, such as his 2009 biopic Vincere. Liliana Cavani, a native of Carpi, near Modena, became internationally known after the success of her 1974 feature film The Night Porter. In addition, actor and filmmaker Vittorio De Sica shot in Ferrara his 1970 movie The Garden of the Finzi-Continis. Other actors from Emilia-Romagna include Gino Cervi, who played Peppone in the Don Camillo 1950s-1960s movie series; Rossano Brazzi, who acted in numerous English-language films, including the 1954 drama film The Barefoot Contessa; and the 1980s comedy duo Gigi e Andrea.

Cuisine and gastronomy

Emilia-Romagna is considered one of the richest regions of Italy with regard to its gastronomic and wine-making tradition. The region is known for its egg and filled pasta made with soft wheat flour. Bologna is notable for pasta dishes like tortellini, lasagne, gramigna and tagliatelle which are found also in many other parts of the region in different declinations.  The Romagna subregion is known as well for pasta dishes like garganelli, strozzapreti, sfoglia lorda and tortelli alla lastra. In the Emilia subregion, except Piacenza which is heavily influenced by the cuisines of Lombardy, rice is eaten to a lesser extent. Polenta, a maize-based dish, is common both in Emilia and Romagna. The celebrated balsamic vinegar is made only in the Emilian cities of Modena and Reggio Emilia, following legally binding traditional procedures. Parmigiano Reggiano (Parmesan Cheese) is produced in Reggio Emilia, Parma, Modena and Bologna and is much used in cooking, while Grana Padano variety is produced in the rest of the region.

Although the Adriatic coast is a major fishing area which produces eels and clams, the region produces more meat products, especially pork-based, including Parma's prosciutto, culatello and Salame Felino, Piacenza's pancetta, coppa and salami, Bologna's mortadella and salame rosa, Modena's zampone, cotechino and cappello del prete  and Ferrara's salama da sugo. Reggio Emilia is the origin of the fresh egg-made pasta cappelletti (similar to Bologna's tortellini but differing in size), the typical erbazzone a spinach and Parmigiano Reggiano salted cake, and Gnocco Fritto, mixed flour stripes fried in boiling oil, eaten in combination with ham or salami. Crescentina is a thin round bread that originates in the Apennines around Modena, and is usually filled with cunza (a spread made from pork lard and flavoured with garlic and rosemary) or with cold cuts, cheese and salty dressings or sweet spreads. Piacenza and Ferrara are also known for some dishes prepared with horse and donkey meat. Regional desserts include zuppa inglese (custard-based dessert made with sponge cake and Alchermes liqueur) and panpepato (Christmas cake made with pepper, chocolate, spices, and almonds). An exhaustive list of the most important regional wines should include Sangiovese from Romagna, Lambrusco from Reggio Emilia or Modena, Cagnina di Romagna, Gutturnio and Trebbiano from Piacenza.

Music 
Emilia-Romagna gave birth to one of the most important composers in the history of music, Giuseppe Verdi, as well as Arturo Toscanini, one of the most acclaimed conductors of the 20th century, and the operatic tenor Luciano Pavarotti.

The region is well known in Italy for its rock and folk musicians, such as Laura Pausini, Raffaella Carrà, Samuele Bersani, Luciano Ligabue, Lucio Dalla, Francesco Guccini, Vasco Rossi and Zucchero. "Romagna mia", a song written in 1954 by Secondo Casadei, is considered by many as the unofficial anthem of Romagna.

Sport

Motorsports 
Ferrari's motorsports division Scuderia Ferrari is also run out of Maranello in the Province of Modena, the teams' colours being red. Ferrari's Formula One team has won 15 Drivers' titles and 16 Constructors' titles. The team has also won multiple Le Mans 24 Hours in sports car racing. Among other legendary Ferrari drivers include pre-Formula One era Tazio Nuvolari, and in the Formula One era Alberto Ascari, Juan Manuel Fangio, John Surtees, Niki Lauda and Kimi Räikkönen include among drivers to have won the title in a Ferrari car. Another Formula 1 team is based here, AlphaTauri in Faenza, the heir of Minardi and Scuderia Toro Rosso.

Ducati Corse is the motorsports division of Ducati's motorcycle company, being the predominant Italian constructor in MotoGP and the Superbike World Championship. Ducati has won one MotoGP title with Australian Casey Stoner in 2007. Stoner is also the most successful rider for the team in MotoGP, having won 23 Grands Prix in his four seasons. Ducati have had multiple World Champions Valentino Rossi and Jorge Lorenzo race for the team. In 2017, Emilia-Romagna native Andrea Dovizioso finished second in the MotoGP championship for Ducati. The team has frequently had at least one Italian rider in its factory team since its entry into the premier class in 2003 at the beginning of the four-stroke engine era. Its first Grand Prix winner was Emilia-Romagna native Loris Capirossi in the team's inaugural season. Ducati have also won multiple Superbike titles with riders such as Carl Fogarty and Troy Bayliss being among title winners.

Aside from Dovizioso and Capirossi, high-profile racers such as Marco Melandri and Marco Simoncelli have also come out of Emilia-Romagna. Simoncelli died in an accident when he was run over on track in the 2011 Malaysian Grand Prix at the age of 24, and was honoured by having the Misano World Circuit named after him.

Emilia-Romagna have two major international race circuits; Autodromo Enzo e Dino Ferrari in Imola and the aforementioned circuit in Misano Adriatico. Imola used to host Formula One between 1980 and 2006, under the banner of San Marino Grand Prix on all but one occasion; as well as hosting two non-championship races in 1963 and 1979. The track was the site for the fatal crash of three-time world champion Ayrton Senna on 1 May 1994, along with a fatal crash the day before of Austrian Roland Ratzenberger. The track was rebuilt after the tragedies and returned to the calendar in a new guise already the following year. Imola was a happy hunting ground for Emilia-Romagna team Scuderia Ferrari during the era on the re-built track, with Michael Schumacher winning the race five times in front of the home crowd. In 2020, Imola returned to the calendar due to the COVID-19 pandemic and hosted the Emilia Romagna Grand Prix.

Football 

Several clubs from Emilia-Romagna compete at a high level on the national stage. Bologna, Parma and Sassuolo compete in the top-flight of Italian football – in Serie A. The region's two biggest clubs are the only two to win major honours: Bologna, which has won seven scudetti and two Coppa Italia trophies, and Parma, winners of four European trophies (two Europa Leagues, one Cup Winners' Cup and one Super Cup) and three Coppe Italia.

The Derby dell'Emilia features Bologna and Parma, whereas the Derby dell'Enza features Parma and Reggiana.

The region has hosted 42 Italy national football team home matches. With 11 professional clubs in 2022/2023 season, the region is only bettered in terms of number of professional clubs by Lombardy. It also has 747 amateur clubs, 1,522 football pitches and 75,328 registered players.

Included in the table below are all sides in the top three tiers of Italian football (Serie A, Serie B and Serie C), as well as any sides that have won major honours.

Other sports 

Another popular sport in this region is basketball. Three teams from Emilia-Romagna currently compete in the Lega Basket Serie A: Virtus Bologna, which with 16 scudetti, 2 Euroleague championships and 8 Coppe Italia is one of the most important teams in Europe, Fortitudo Bologna, which has also won two scudetti, and Reggiana from Reggio Emilia.

The region has a very strong tradition in volleyball as well, with three clubs that are among the oldest, most winning and prestigious teams in Italy and Europe: Parma, Modena and Porto Ravenna. These three clubs have won a combined 9 CEV Champions Leagues, 4 won by Modena, 3 by Ravenna and 2 by Parma. There is not another comparable region in Europe with such a big presence of successful volleyball clubs. Another important volleyball club which has achieved important results both in Italy and in Europe during the last 15 years is Copra Volley from Piacenza.

Panthers Parma are one of four American football teams that have participated in every edition of the Italian Football League.

Zebre compete professionally in the United Rugby Championship, the combined Irish, Italian, Scottish, South African and Welsh rugby union league. The club's home ground, the Stadio Sergio Lanfranchi, is located in Parma. Included in the table below are all sides in the top two tiers of Italian rugby.

See also 
 Emilian-Romagnol language
 List of European regions by GDP
 Emilia-Romagna luthiers

References

Further reading
 Alfani, Guido. "The famine of the 1590s in Northern Italy. An analysis of the greatest “system shock” of sixteenth century." Histoire & mesure 26.XXVI-1 (2011): 17-50 online.
 Bayer, Andrea. North of the Apennines: sixteenth-century Italian painting in Lombardy and Emilia-Romagna (Metropolitan Museum of Art, 2003).
 Bianchi, Patrizio, and Maria Grazia Giordani. "Innovation policy at the local and national levels: The case of Emilia‐Romagna." European Planning Studies 1.1 (1993): 25–41.
 Cooke, Philip. "Building a twenty‐first century regional economy in Emilia‐Romagna." European Planning Studies 4.1 (1996): 53–62.
 Passarelli, Gianluca, and Dario Tuorto. "The Lega Nord goes south: The electoral advance in Emilia-Romagna: A new territorial model?." Political Geography 31.7 (2012): 419-428 online.
 Rossi, Leonardo, Britta Holtschoppen, and Christoph Butenweg. "Official data on the economic consequences of the 2012 Emilia-Romagna earthquake: a first analysis of database SFINGE." Bulletin of Earthquake Engineering 17.9 (2019): 4855–4884.

Guide books
 Facaros, Dana, and Michael Pauls. Northern Italy: Emilia-Romagna: including Bologna, Ferrara, Modena, Parma, Ravenna and the Republic of San Marino (2018) excerpt
 Macadam, Alta. Blue Guide Emilia Romagna (2017) excerpt

External links 

 Emilia-Romagna Region Official site
 Emilia-Romagna Travel Guide VIDEO

 
Regions of Italy
NUTS 2 statistical regions of the European Union
Wine regions of Italy